Aurelien Innocent Oko Bota (born November  23, 1988 in Mfoundi) is a professional Cameroonian footballer who plays as a midfielder and he is currently free agent.

Honours

Coton Sport
Cameroon Premiere Division: 2005, 2006, 2007, 2008.
Cameroonian Cup: 2007, 2008.
CAF Champions League:  2008 as a runners-up

Al-Majd
Damascus International Championship: 2009

References

External links

 Aurelien Oko Bota at Eurosport.com

1988 births
Living people
Cameroonian footballers
Cameroonian expatriate footballers
Association football midfielders
Expatriate footballers in Syria
Expatriate footballers in Iraq
Expatriate footballers in Egypt
Cameroonian expatriates in Syria
Cameroonian expatriates in Iraq
Cameroonian expatriates in Egypt
Cameroonian expatriate sportspeople in Iraq
Egyptian Premier League players
Al-Mina'a SC players
Al Ahly SC players
Syrian Premier League players